The Essential Jimi Hendrix is a compilation album of songs by American rock musician Jimi Hendrix, released in 1978 by Reprise Records. Some editions in the UK, Japan and Italy also contained a 7-inch 33 rpm one-sided EP single of the Jimi Hendrix Experience performing the song "Gloria".

In 1989, the album was combined with the follow-up compilation, The Essential Jimi Hendrix Volume Two, and issued on compact disc as The Essential Jimi Hendrix Volumes One and Two.

Track listing

LP/Cassette version (1978)

CD version (1989)

Personnel
Jimi Hendrixguitar, vocals
Noel Reddingbass guitar, backing vocals
Mitch Mitchelldrums
Buddy Milesdrums on "Still Raining, Still Dreaming", "Room Full of Mirrors", "Ezy Ryder", "Machine Gun"
Billy Coxbass guitar on "Room Full of Mirrors", "Izabella", "Freedom", "Dolly Dagger", "Stepping Stone", "Drifting", "Ezy Ryder", "Machine Gun"

References

External links

1978 greatest hits albums
Compilation albums published posthumously
Jimi Hendrix compilation albums
Warner Records compilation albums